Elizabeth Gwladys Davies (24 February 1917 – 27 January 2018) was a British radio drama producer and director, and a prolific dramatist who contributed scripts to radio, primarily at the BBC, for over fifty years. Her work appeared on the BBC Home Service and radio For the Forces  during the Second World War and continued to appear on BBC Radio 4 well into the 1990s.  As a director of drama she produced the long-running radio soap opera Mrs Dale's Diary and worked closely with writers ranging from the Trinidadian author Samuel Selvon to the historian Lady Antonia Fraser, while directing hundreds of plays and serials for the radio.  She died at the age of 100.

Life and works
Betty Davies was born in Aberystwyth, Wales, on 24 February 1917, towards the end of the First World War, to Esther née Warrington, who was Welsh, and Percy Davies, an English civil servant. Davies was an only child, although her mother was one of six daughters and a single son which provided Davies with a large family network of cousins which sustained her until her death. Davies and her parents moved to London after the war.

Davies prepared to fulfill her ambition of a BBC career by learning shorthand and typing, and by reading for an honours degree in English with subsidiary Latin at University College London. She joined the BBC in June 1939, as a secretary, and moved through the Corporation ranks, serving as secretary to the Presentation Manager for Outside Broadcasts and Presentations before becoming Research Assistant in the Analysis Section of the Listener Research Department by November 1946.

She had already established herself as a contributing writer to BBC programmes from 1943, in diverse offerings that demonstrated a light touch and included collaborations with musicians. With the band leader Miff Ferrie, later better known as the long-time producer and agent for the British comedian Tommy Cooper, she wrote the musical entertainment Blow Your Own Trumpet! which was first broadcast on the Home Service in 1944 and later shown on BBC Television in 1947.

Her early contributions to radio sometimes seemed to develop a theme: For the magazine programme Divertissement transmitted on For the Forces in 1943, she wrote The Telephone, a 'story with a surprise by Betty Davies'. In 1959, when she was preoccupied as 'main producer' of Mrs Dale's Diary, she wrote and produced The Telephone Call for the Home Service. Her 1945 play Best Seller, originally produced for the Home Service by the actor and director Hugh Stewart, was remade for the Home Service in 1961 by David Geary.

Davies also wrote for Children's Hour, with plays such as The Conjuror's Rabbit, broadcast twice in 1946, and again in 1949 – a recording is preserved in the British Library Sound Archive – and The Silver Flame, with music by Alan Paul, broadcast in 1951.

In the course of her career, Davies was involved in well over 1,300 BBC productions as identifiable in the BBC's searchable database, BBC Genome. While the site lists over 2,000 productions, some include contributors with similar names, including the actor Betty Ann Davies and many of Davies's productions did not list the producer in the Radio Times, the main source for BBC Genome.

Just the Job for Jones

Among the many young women who brought new energy and ideas to BBC radio during the war, starting careers in broadcasting that would endure for decades, Davies cut a highly unusual path in entertainment by taking, with the BBC's blessing, a two-hour musical comedy, set in the BBC's Broadcasting House, into London's West End which satirized the BBC.

Just the Job for Jones, with book and lyrics by Davies and music by her established radio collaborator Alan Paul, was a big enough event to attract senior BBC management and the theatrical press. Presented at the Fortune Theatre, with members of the corporation's theatrical society, Ariel, making up the company, it was nonetheless a full-scale spectacle, produced by two of the outstanding talents in BBC drama and comedy.

Audrey Cameron, a leading producer (and actor) in radio with hundreds of credits, was joined by Douglas Moodie, a producer of musicals and comedies who would go on to produce the BBC's television police classic Dixon of Dock Green, took charge of the production, and were to give Davies a free rein.

What set the show apart was the innovative way in which Davies interwove musical gags and jabs at the BBC culture with material inspired by her day job, working in Listener Research to compile confidential reports on listeners' and viewers' reactions to programmes. One of her lyrics, teasingly sung by a 'listener', went: 'I'm not a prude/but I think the Third's rude', poking fun at the young cultural network, the Third Programme. Sir William Halley, Director-General of the BBC, who had devised the network, was in the audience, with Lord Simon, chairman of the BBC, and his fellow governors. 
 
The Third was not spared further attention – when a man turns up for a Third Programme interview he is, indicatively, bearded and in sandals; a spiv selling mouth organs seeks out the distinguished chief conductor of The Proms Sir Malcolm Sargent. All of the corporation's bandwidths would receive attention.

Clifford Davis, writing in the Daily Mirror – A girl takes the mike out of the BBC  – described Davies as a 'slim dark-haired B.B.C. girl'. He added: 
Bachelor girl Betty wrote book and lyrics unaided in her Maida Vale flatlet. It took her two months work after her daily stint in the Listeners' Research Department....
Does Betty take the mike out of the B.B.C.? Of course. How will Lord Simon, chairman of the Corporation, his fellow governors, Director General Sir William Haley, and other radio barons react?
"We shall have to wait and see," says Betty. "No one's vetted the script."

Making merry with the criticism of the BBC and setting the criticism to music, did not set Davies back in her career. A complaint about television's new intrusion into the home was sung: 
We feel bewitched and bewildered
By acrobats thrown in your face.
A stomach's all right, but X-rayed in the light
It really looks quite out of place.

According to The Stage, Britain's theatre journal of record, it was 'extremely enjoyable'. It also signalled the end of her research into the audience, and to her move to drama full-time.

Mrs Dale's Diary

By the time Davies became assistant producer on Mrs Dale's Diary, in June 1953, the BBC's first long-running serial drama had been airing for over five years, since January 1948.  Each weekday a new episode was broadcast, introduced by the title character, Mrs Dale, with a new diary entry on the latest domestic crisis. Initially a feminine perspective on Britain's middle-class suburban family in a nation recovering from war and austerity, it was required listening for many. According to The Daily Telegraph, The Queen Mother said about the programme: 'It is the only way of knowing what goes on in a middle-class family'.

Mrs Dale's Diary had been due for a makeover when Davies joined the programme in 1953, and Davies was part of that refreshment. In a later, feminist, deconstruction of the programme in 2013, Kristen Skoog argued that the BBC's male culture took over the series. In her essay, "They're 'Doped' by that Dale Diary: Women's Serial Drama, the BBC and British Post-War Change", she wrote:

Being a domestic serial Mrs Dale's Diary was from its very inception categorized (and devalued) as popular feminized mass culture, mainly written by women for a female audience and therefore it was not admired among BBC producers. This had resulted in producers working on a rota or in the engagement of outside producers on an ad-hoc basis. This changed with ... Antony Kearey – an actor who had started to work on the serial as Assistant in the Drama Department Script Unit – and in June 1953 he was hired as the main producer for the serial. His appointment would guarantee greater editorial control and continuity. As main producer he was dedicated and keen to improve the serial. Already in April, he had [suggested] that a complete break with the current editorial policy was needed and that national events could be mentioned. Before Kearey's appointment it had also been confirmed that the serial was to be allocated not only a producer but also an assistant – Betty Davies, who took over as main producer when Kearey left in 1955 ...A few months into his new position, Kearey said that the main priority was to raise the level of scripts by better reflecting the life of a middle-class family in a London suburb: 'greater research by scriptwriters into their material is necessary if the past 'vagueness' is to be overcome'....

Kearey's tenure was brief. By the time of Mrs Dale's 2,000th edition in November 1955, Davies was the main producer. Her extensive experience in research for the BBC and credits as a writer stood her in good stead on the programme, where she continued until 1962. Mrs Dale was then due her next makeover, which was to see the series become The Dales, while Davies would be taking up her influential role in the mainstream of radio drama.

Allen Andrews , writing in the Daily Herald, considered the programme and its audience at the time of that 2,000th edition, also talking to Davies for his article, The dream world of Mrs Dale. As the BBC Sound Archive retains only five of the more than five thousand editions, he also usefully captured the mood of the serial:

This week, in a church that does not exist, two people who do not exist either, were married. 
And on Monday, millions of us will hear all about it when the harp strings are plucked to turn the 2,000th page of Mrs. Dale's Diary. At a reception given by the B.B.C. to celebrate the double occasion, the 'bride,' standing by a cardboard cake, wickedly observes that this is radio's first shotgun wedding.
For, in her private capacity as actress, Julia Braddock, she is expecting a baby in March. 
This is the sort of remark that infuriates the fans, for it destroys the dream-world of Mrs. Dale. The doctor's wife is, the BBC claims, 'part of the mythology of our island.'...
 
Andrews took a sympathetic view of the programme and its audience – asking what it offered the 'Dale day-dreamers' and declaring in one word: 'FRIENDSHIP'.  'Mrs Dale', he wrote, 'is our dream Mum.'  She is a nice, confident and competent woman, inhabiting a world where nothing ever happens to her – it happens to other people.

'Ask her pretty puppet-mistress, radio-producer Betty Davies', he adds. 'All movements of the Dale marionettes suggested by the covey of script-writers must accord with Miss Davies' fundamental conception of Dale characteristics and BBC policy.'

"The Dales", says Betty Davies, "are an idealised version of the middle-class, suburban professional family". 
"They are improvements on reality. They are how we should like to see a family, more united than in actuality". 
"And Mrs Dale is the rock, the stable MUM.  Dreadful things happen to other people, but we can rely on Mrs Dale not to do anything wild or silly, or break down. SHE is our comfort and re-assurance". 

Like the Queen representing all that is good in government, Andrews muses, people accept the myth of Mrs Dale because 'it serves our purposes'.  'Mrs Dale, the tea-cup queen, stands for all that is nice about home-life'.

Throughout the Davies years at Mrs Dale's Diary, Mrs Dale was played by Ellis Powell. In 2012, the actor Penelope Keith, a Mrs Dale fan herself and a serial star of television comedies, presented a programme for BBC Radio 4 called I'm Rather Worried about Jim, taking its title from what had become Mrs Dale's catch-phrase that regularly repeated in her opening diary entry. Jim Dale was her doctor husband.  The programme analysed the appeal of Mrs Dale, and also looked at the real-life drama that ensued when the original Mrs Dale, Ellis Powell, was brutally replaced by the more glamorous Jessie Matthews; a drama that took place when Davies left the programme. Ellis Powell was to die three months after her departure from the Dales.

Betty the Hat

In her transition from Mrs Dale to the radio drama mainstream, Davies continued to produce Mrs Dale while establishing herself as a producer of the popular Midweek Theatre plays for BBC Radio 2. Already known as a particularly stylish character while working on Mrs Dale – the hats that became her trademark set her apart from other producers and reflected her theatrical flair – she built up a reputation for her work with actors in an impressively wide range of work. 
Betty the Hat, as she was affectionately known throughout broadcasting for her invariably stylish headwear, was the director of choice for many writers. In The Independent obituary of the prolific and pioneering television dramatist Sheila Hodgson, Jack Adrian wrote of her radio work with Davies: '... in the main Hodgson aimed to quicken the pulse in as diverting a manner as possible, as in  The Long Drive Home (1967; directed by the legendary Betty Davies), which featured a clever murder plot set in the world of golf-bores with a cast (Timothy West, William Fox, Peter Howell, the inimitable Rolf Lefebvre) you could only have afforded on the radio. '

Many of the finest actors joined Davies's productions, but while making a mark in the classics and crime, she also developed a virtual Welsh repertory company with her promotion of Welsh writing, from established figures such as Emlyn Williams to the prolific actor and writer William Ingram, to the writer and actor Elizabeth Morgan. Sometimes she managed to combine the most illustrious of actors with the talents of her regular collaborators, as with her production of Emyln Williams' Night Must Fall which starred Dame Sybil Thorndike opposite William Ingram, better known as the author of scores of radio plays, many produced by Davies. That production is retained in the British Library's Sound Archive.

Her collaborations with Elizabeth Morgan often reflected shared social concerns, as with her production of Morgan's According to the Regulations, about the 1911 rail strike when Llanelly, Wales,  saw the arrival of the Worcestershire Regiment who shot dead two men, an event which the play commemorated. Another of Morgan's plays, It's Warm, and There's Company, was motivated by the situation in the 1970s which maintained that women who needed an operation that would render them sterile needed the consent of their husband or male partners, regardless of possible life-threatening complications.  Morgan's play about women who found themselves in hospital featured a young actress, just down from Cambridge, Miriam Margolyes, who would become one of the most successful voice artists in the English-speaking world, playing a much older lady against established actresses such as Gudrun Ure, Morgan and Katherine Parr. Women listeners, in similar situations, deluged the BBC with letters and phone calls. Davies arranged several interviews on the corporations Woman's Hour programme. The law would change a few years later.

Women were to figure strongly in many of Davies's productions, as writers and leading actors. Her 1974 production of Lady Antonia Fraser's The Heroine, for instance, had the actress Maxine Audley in the lead, with a roster of leading women actors, including Patricia Quinn, Rosalind Shanks, Jane Wenham and Carole Boyd.

Martin Jarvis, the actor, director and renowned voice artist, worked with Davies in her last decade at Broadcasting House and stated that what he learned from her is still gratefully applied in his own audio productions. Writing of her at the time of the celebration of Davies's life at the BBC Club, he provided vivid images of the famous headwear: 'In the years that I worked with her I never saw her bare-headed. Soft, velour, broad-brimmed, outlandishly wide, rakishly green, dazzlingly scarlet. All as glamorous as she appeared herself.'

Jarvis also gave a strong sense of her studio presence as she sought to unleash the imagination of the actors: 'She encouraged us to imagine the pain, the anxiety, the physicality. And then in her swooping, humorous, cultured vocal tones (reminiscent of the great Edith Evans but slightly more Welsh) she blurted, almost incongruously: 'Stick a pencil in your mouth, Martin dear, that'll tell the listeners!!' Yes, in a medium where words seem paramount, she knew its other great secret: how physical radio drama can be, at its best.

So indelible was Davies's studio presence that in 2019 her hats were part of a story on BBC Radio 4's Desert Island Discs: Dame Esther Rantzen, well known as a television presenter and notorious for an eight-year clandestine relationship with her married BBC boss Desmond Wilcox, rehearsed a story she had often used to explain her departure from radio drama: 'But I got into making sound effect, so then a lady producer who always wore a hat, even in the studio, did a drama – I was in drama – where there was a distant skating accident, and I had to make the sound of a skating accident. I thought it would be skates falling on ice, she thought it would be flesh. So I had to fall over on a plank five times before I got the sound she accepted. And then I limped up to office and resigned in triplicate. But it was fun, actually; it was fun.'
It was also not the full story. It was not just the rigour and physicality of a Davies production that led to Rantzen's departure; Rantzen had already come to a parting of the way with the charismatic and highly regarded radio drama producer John Gibson. But Betty the Hat was still the story in the 21st century.

Black Betty

By the 1960s, new voices were being heard in England, including newly arrived voices from the Caribbean, and Davies was consistent in her support of the diverse new talents emerging. So active was Davies in promoting Caribbean writers and actors that to some she became known as 'Black Betty'.

Between 1965's Lost Property and Zeppi's Machine on 26 February 1977 – two days after her official retirement from the BBC staff on 24 February  – Davies produced no fewer than 15 plays by the Trinidadian novelist and playwright Samuel Selvon. Selvon, who also published as Sam Selvon, had confirmed his reputation with the 1956 novel The Lonely Londoners. He was among the first writers to present the emigrant experience of the "Windrush generation" of West Indians who found themselves looking for employment in the cold streets of London.

The Lonely Londoners was notable for its use of dialect both in the dialogue and narrative, and Selvon's characters were vividly distinct as they went about their day-to-day lives on the economic margins of London, telling stories and pursuing relationships with while women. He also took up the stories of Trinidad's Indo-Caribbean community.

His first novel, A Brighter Sun (1952), became Highway in the Sun in Davies' 1967 production for BBC Radio 4, and was to be the title of a collection of his radio plays by Peepal Tree Press, in 1991. Characters from his stories and novels came to life in his many radio drama and comedies.

Davies was not the only producer to work with Selvon at BBC radio, and Selvon was not the only Caribbean writer whose plays she produced. She worked with the Trinidadian author Mustapha Matura and Michael Abbensetts, a Guyana-born playwright. Davies would return to BBC radio to produce Abbensetts' The Sunny Side of the Street for 29 July 1977, after her retirement. (She continued to produce and direct plays for the BBC into the 1980s.)

The Caribbean writers provided good roles for actors and among the leading performers she worked with were Frank Singuineau, Mona Hammond, Rudolph Walker, Stefan Kalipha, Norman Beaton, Don Warrington, Tommy Eytle, Ram John Holder and the singer and actor Nadia Cattouse.

In 2005, Cattouse was interviewed for Stephen Bourne's book  Black in the British Frame: The Black Experience in Film and Television and talked about radio. 'There was John Gibson, a producer from Northern Ireland ...  who did a lot of Caribbean plays ...then there was Betty Davies, who came in the wake of John Gibson. We understood some people in the BBC renamed her 'Black Betty' because she was always producing plays with black actors in the cast. If it wasn't for people like them we wouldn't have worked.'

Later life

Retirement at the age of 60, as the rules stood at the BBC in 1977, was somewhat notional for Davies. She continued to work as a writer and producer, providing scripts and productions for the BBC. She also produced for Capital Radio (Capital London) in the days when commercial radio was obliged to provide public service broadcasting. Awarded the "London General Entertainment" station, Capital maintained drama and dramatic readings. Martin Jarvis was among the voices she produced for Capital, while she also served as a judge on Capital's playwriting competition.

She also produced Jarvis in an unabridged reading of Charles Dickens' David Copperfield as an audiobook, a story she would later dramatise for the BBC The Personal History of David Copperfield as a Classic Serial which ran from September 1991, until November 1991 on Radio 4. Her dramatisation of An Imaginary Experience by Mary Wesley for Radio 4 in 1995 was among the last of her writing tasks.

She had been a traveller of the world throughout her career, but when she finally wound down from her work she continued to extend her travels. At the time of her death in 2018, David Roberts, the son of her first cousin, David Ceredig Roberts, wrote to Nigel Deacon's radio drama pages of his Diversity website to recount some of her travels: 'while she was renowned for her globetrotting, from Antarctica to the Karakoram', he wrote, 'nothing beats the time I bumped into her by accident in the countryside near Cienfuegos in Cuba. This was in 1983 - deep in the Cold War, when western tourists were rare. She really did get about!'

He added: 'Until mid-2017, having outlived all her BBC contemporaries, she continued to live alone in the flat in Shepherd's Bush. Her longtime relationship with the Australian actor and writer Bruce Beeby had continued until his death in 2013.'

Davies died just short of her 101st birthday on 27 January 2018, in Staunton, near Coleford, Gloucestershire, England.

Radio plays written or produced by Betty Davies

References

External links
 Betty Davies Radio Drama page, Diversity Website

1917 births
2018 deaths
British centenarians
20th-century Welsh dramatists and playwrights
Welsh women dramatists and playwrights
British radio writers
BBC radio producers
British radio producers
People from Aberystwyth
Welsh radio personalities
Alumni of University College London
20th-century British businesspeople
Women centenarians
Women radio producers